The Thrill Seekers is a 1927 American silent drama film directed by Harry Revier and starring Ruth Clifford, Gloria Grey and Robert McKim.

Cast
 Jimmy Fulton as Gerald Kenworth
 Ruth Clifford as Adrean Wainwright
 Gloria Grey as Mystery Girl
 Sally Long as Marie St. Claire
 Lee Moran as Lester, the Valet
 Robert McKim as 	Hal Walker
 Raymond Wells as Jack Newman
 Harold Austin as Jimmy, the Chauffeur
 Max Wagner as A Hood

References

Bibliography
 Connelly, Robert B. The Silents: Silent Feature Films, 1910-36, Volume 40, Issue 2. December Press, 1998.
 Munden, Kenneth White. The American Film Institute Catalog of Motion Pictures Produced in the United States, Part 1. University of California Press, 1997.

External links
 

1927 films
1927 drama films
1920s English-language films
American silent feature films
Silent American drama films
Films directed by Harry Revier
American black-and-white films
1920s American films